Vice-Admiral Syed Mohammad Ahsan  ( b. 1920 – d. 1990) often known as S. M. Ahsan, was a senior admiral of the Pakistan Navy who was the Commander in Chief of the Pakistan Navy, serving under President Ayub Khan from 1966 until 1969.

After that, he briefly served in President Yahya Khan's administration as Finance minister before becoming Governor of East Pakistan in September 1969 until resigning in March 1971 to return to Pakistan. Gaining a commission in the Royal Indian Navy, he participated as a naval officer during World War II with the British and later decided to become a Pakistani citizen following the partition of India by the United Kingdom in 1947. He played a crucial role in establishing the Inter-Services Intelligence and served in the war with India in 1965. Assuming the naval command in 1966, he took initiatives such as establishing the naval special forces, expanding the capabilities of Naval Intelligence and modernising the navy.

He was a trusted colleague of President Ayub Khan while attending the cabinet meetings chaired by President Ayub which enabled him influentially consolidate his national security role in the Ayub administration. After completing his tenure as naval chief, he was appointed as Governor of East Pakistan while serving as a cabinet minister in the Yahya administration.

On 1 September 1969, Vice-Admiral Ahsan assumed as the Governor of East Pakistan until his resignation, in protest, on 7 March 1971. He was then posted back to West Pakistan.

Early life

Ahsan was an ethnic Muhajir born in Hyderabad Deccan, Indian Empire, to an Urdu-speaking Hyderabadi Syed family in December 1920. After being schooled in Hyderabad, he attended the Nizam College of the Osmania University and gained B.A. degree and decided to join the Royal Indian Navy (RIN) in 1938 as a Sub-Lieutenant when his first cousin M.J. Syed joined the Royal Indian Merchant Navy.

Naval career

Early career
In 1938, Ahsan was accepted to join the Britannia Royal Naval College in United Kingdom where he was trained, and after a short probationary period in Royal Navy, he was given commission as Lieutenant in Executive Branch of the Royal Indian Navy. He specialized in Signals and was an instructor at the Combined Cadet Force in Liverpool, England.

World War II
During World War II he was a RIN naval officer on the side of Great Britain and saw actions in the Atlantic battle against the German Kriegsmarine. Upon posting back to British India, he participated in Arakan Campaign in 1942–43 and later served well in the Mediterranean theatre in 1944–45. His actions of valor earned him to be decorated with the Distinguished Service Cross by the United Kingdom after the end of World War II in 1945.

In 1946, he was appointed as aide-de-camp to Viceroy of India, Lord Mountbatten and assisted him in cabinet meetings to resolve political crises in the British Indian Empire.

Post-Independence
When the United Kingdom announced its intentions to partition of India in 1947, Ahsan decided to opt for Pakistan and was introduced by Lord Mountbatten to Muhammad Ali Jinnah as his aide-de-camp. In a meeting with Jinnah, Lord Mountbatten reportedly quoted: [President] Jinnah, I give you Pakistan, I give you my Aide'd camp, Lieutenant Ahsan."

At the time of his joining the Pakistan Navy, the Indian Navy sent the military seniority list to Pakistan's Ministry of Defence (MoD) where then Lieutenant Ahsan was the 4th ranking officer in the Executive Branch in terms of seniority with Service No. PN-007. He was assigned as military adviser and ADC to founding father and the first Governor-General M.A. Jinnah. In 1947, Lt. Ahsan was the first person at the Jinnah Terminal to receive Lord Mountabattens when they first arrived to Karachi to meet Jinnah. He did not participated in the first war with India on Kashmir crises in 1947.

On 30 September 1949, he witnessed the commissioning of the PNS Tippu Sultan from the Royal Navy and was subsequently promoted as Lieutenant-Commander. He was made First Executive officer of Tippu Sultan and later commanding the PNS Tariq as Commander in 1950. He participated in Task Force 92 alongside Commander A.R. Khan who commanded the Tippu Sultan and made a first goodwill visit to Malta, Middle East and Eastern Europe.

His first assignment included his role as Deputy Director of Naval Intelligence at the Navy NHQ while establishing his intelligence department.

At December 1952, he was asked by the Director-General of Inter-Services Intelligence Major-General Robert Cawthome to send a priority report that compiled detail discussions with Pakistani military personnel on the basic principles of the ISI. In addition, he was also asked for military's reaction towards the Basic Principles Committee where he ultimately warned of the theocracy and concluded that the economic disparities between East and West Pakistan must be addressed to prevent the breaking-up of the nation's unity. In 1959–60, he served as chief of staff of the Navy NHQ under the Navy Commander in Chief.

In 1955–56, he was posted in the MoD's diplomatic assignment as the Naval attaché at the Pakistan Embassy situated in the Washington D.C.– the state capital of the United States. During this time, he went to attend the Naval War College in Newport in Rhode Island, graduated with a staff course degree from the College of Naval Command and Staff of the Naval War College.

In 1957, he was promoted as Captain and assigned to command the cruiser warship, the PNS Babur, that sailed in Karachi the following year.

In 1960, he was promoted to the one-star rank, Commodore, and directed the Naval Intelligence during this time. In 1961–62, he again served on the diplomatic assignment when he was appointed as deputy chief military planning officer of Southeast Asia Treaty Organization (SEATO) in Bangkok and later became its chief military officer.

Flag rank
In 1962, he was promoted as Rear Admiral and established the Logistics Command to resolve the logistics problems in both East and West Pakistan. In 1964, he was sent to Dacca and took over the chairmanship of the East-Pakistan Inland Water Transport Authority where he had begun training of East-Pakistani military on riverine tactics with the absence of the strong naval presence. During this time, he became the principal military secretary to President Ayub Khan. In a short time, Rear-Admiral Ahsan gained influence on President Ayub Khan and advised him on important military issues concerning on the defence of the nation at the cabinet meeting chaired by the President Ayub.

While in East, he played a crucial role in deployment of armed forces and prevented the army to involve in politics while opposing any military action against East Pakistani activists after the riots in 1964 despite the calls.
 
In 1965, he was stationed back to Pakistan and assumed the command of Naval Intelligence as its Director-General, and participated in second war with India in 1965. Rear-Admiral Ahsan and his staff at the Navy NHQ helped planned out the naval offense in Dwarka and partially leading the fleet as its Commander. The operation met with mixed results but it stopped the Indian Air Force raiding Karachi and Pakistan's coastal areas as Admiral Ahsan collated the intelligence reports on the Indian Navy's strategic western naval positions, and orchestrated naval operations against the Indian Navy.

Commander-in-Chief
After the war, he was most senior admiral serving in the navy and was nominated for navy's chief of staff by outgoing naval chief Admiral A.R. Khan in 1966. His nomination papers were approved by President Ayub Khan in 1966, and appointed him as commander in chief of Navy.

In 1967, he was promoted to the three-star rank, Vice-Admiral, and was honored with Sitara-e-Pakistan by President Ayub.

As a naval chief, he oversaw the induction of the Daphné submarines procured from France in 1966 in navy's submarine branch.

Since 1966–68, Admiral Ahsan knew of Indian Navy massive procurement and acquisitions of weapon systems being acquired from the Soviet Union and United Kingdom. On multiple meetings with President Ayub, he raised the issue of modernizing the navy against India, and kept warning the Army GHQ of potential and possible Indian Navy's attack on West and East region of the country; his reservations were bypassed on every meeting and warnings were not heed due to the financial reasons. His Navy NHQ staff was in brief conflict with the Air AHQ staff over the establishment of naval aviation by induction of fighter jets in 1968. The Air AHQ staff bypassed his recommendation over the loss of jets and their pilots in seas in an event of conflict with India. He succeeded in convincing President Ayub in acquiring the missile boats only, and permissions were granted to procured the Soviet-built Osa-class missile boat in 1968.

He led series of unsuccessful talks with the Soviet Navy and Russian Marshal Andrei Grechko in 1969 due to their warming of relations with India. From 1966 to 1969, his Navy NHQ staff tussle with the Finance ministry over the issues of budget and financial support for modernization of navy without any success.

He established the Special Services Group Navy (SSG[N]) and commissioned the Pakistan Marines in 1966 after commissioning the naval facilities for training purposes in the special operations.

In 1966, he further accepted the recommendation from United States Navy to train its special forces unit, an equivalent organization to that of U.S. Navy SEALs.

In Karachi, he went on to commission the Naval Academy to provide teaching of the naval staff and cadets instead of sending cadets to United Kingdom for training and education. From 1966 to 1968, he served on the served on the Board of Governors of Cadet College Petaro.

Vice-Admiral Ahsan is also credited with founding Port Qasim – Pakistan's second port – after exploring the coast around Phitti Creek, when he was Chief of Naval Staff. He immediately met with then–Foreign Minister Zulfikar Ali Bhutto where he convinced Bhutto in 1972 to locate the port there.

After convincing Bhutto, he supervised the construction and establishment of the port where he set up the main industries and machineries at the Port. The main channel of this port bears his name. From 1966 to 1969, he established the East-Pakistan Navy and commissioned the warships, PNS Sylhet and PNS Tughril, in its arm. However, he struggled with expanding the East-Pakistan Navy's capabilities as many sailors and officers had defected to India to join the Awami League's military wing– the Mukti Bahini.

Political career

Yahya administration and governorship

After President Ayub Khan tendered resignation due to worsening of law and order situation in the country, and invited Commander-in-Chief of the Pakistan Army General Yahya Khan to take over the presidency. In 1969, he relieved the naval command to Admiral Muzaffar Hassan to be appointed as deputy CMLA under Yahya administration.

In August 1969, he joined the Yahya administration as cabinet minister of finance, statistics, commerce, industry, and planning commission. However, this was short-lived and Admiral Ahsan was appointed as Governor of East Pakistan on 1 September 1969.

The assignment was considered very difficult by the Pakistani military when many senior officials in West were reluctant to accept appointments in East Pakistan. The law and order situation was quickly deteriorating under the martial law enforced by Major-General Muzaffaruddin in East.

In the Cabinet meeting, President Yahya was told that the situation in East is at a critical, and his government needed an administrator with a good reputation in the province. In an attempt to control the law and order in the country, Admiral Ahsan's service was extended and appointed governor in East and arrived his Dacca to take an oath from Dhaka High Court Justice Salahuddin at the Dhaka University in 1969. In talks with representatives of Pakistani print and electronic news media, Admiral Ahsan reportedly quoted that he was "pretty sure" that by 1971, new government of elected representatives would replace the interim government."

He became governor of East Pakistan in 1969. Soon after, he was reportedly in conflict with Governor of West Pakistan, Air Marshal Nur Khan, over the issues of legal and political reforms in the country while President Yahya was in conflict with his army chief Lieutenant-General Abdul Hamid Khan on administrative issues in 1969–70.

Many initiatives were taken by Admiral Ahsan to resolve the political crises of East by keeping in good terms with President Yahya and noted that the six-point were not new. In 1969, he paid a state visit to the United States to meet with Elliot Richardson to gain foreign support for East Pakistan and sustainability in the region. In addition, he also arranged the visit of U.S. Navy officials to visit him at the Governor's House, Dhaka to strengthened military relations with the United States.

In 1970, his government coordinated efforts to rehabilitate the infrastructure after the deadly cyclone and used the military coordinate to relief operations after meeting with President Yahya who had instruct him to "take charge".

1970 general elections, resignation and 1971 war

In 1970, he oversaw the electoral process to hold the nationwide parliamentary elections held in the country in a charged atmosphere. Under his rule, the law and order had been improved and it was projected that Awami League led by Sheikh Mujibur Rahman would claim the supermajority in the provincial assembly that would allow them to form the national government in Islamabad. The Awami League secured ~39.2% of the seats in the Parliament as opposed to the Pakistan Peoples Party (PPP) led by Zulfikar Ali Bhutto who ended up with 18.6% of the seats – all from West Pakistan. Zulfikar Bhutto refused to negotiate the six points when President Yahya met with Sheikh Mujibur Rahman and put more stress on the situation after telling his party workers not to visit Dhaka. About the postpone of the power ceremony, Kamal Hossain reportedly notified Admiral Ahsan of "danger" of delaying the power transition.

Together with his principal staff officer Lieutenant-General Sahabzada Yaqub Khan, he provided his arguments on numerous occasions to President Yahya against the military actions in East and their arguments were well known to the United States's politicians.

On 22 February 1971, Ahsan attended a high-level meeting chaired by President Yahya Khan, a gathering which Ahsan described as "tense", where the atmosphere was highly "anti-Bengali", with no Bengali representation in the policy and decision-making. He opposed a military solution to the supposed crisis in East Pakistan.

Admiral Ahsan renewed his offer to President Yahya, Rahman, and Bhutto to work out an arrangement where the Pakistani military deployments to support the Eastern Command could get out intact, without being humiliated. Known as the Ahsan Formula, Pakistan would become a confederation of the two wings, giving East Pakistan a degree of autonomy. Yahya would head the confederation. East Pakistanis in West Pakistan would be moved to East Pakistan and vice versa. National assets would be divided in proportion to population. The military vetoed the plan.

In February 1971, he supervised the military deployments in East that were already preparing to conduct a military operation to curb the movement.

Disheartened and isolated by his colleagues, Admiral Ahsan tried reaching President Yahya by telephone without success. On 7 March 1971, Admiral Ahsan resigned in protest from his position as Martial Law Administrator of East Pakistan.

He participated in the war with India in 1971 but without an assignment of any command at the Navy NHQ and sought honorable discharge from the navy after the war ended in the winter of 1971.

In an article titled "A nation's shame" published in the Newsline magazine of September 2000, Ahsan concluded:
But who was responsible for creating this hostile atmosphere and hatred among the people? The situation deteriorated further after General Yahya Khan postponed the first session of the newly elected constituent assembly. It became very clear immediately after the election results that the generals were not prepared to transfer power to the Awami League. First the delay in summoning the National Assembly session and later its postponement confirmed the Bengalis' worst fears, that the election results were not acceptable both to the generals and to the majority of West Pakistani politicians. Zulfikar Ali Bhutto publicly called for a boycott of the assembly session. Such a transgression was bound to further fuel public resentment.

War Enquiry Commission

He welcomed the formation of the War Enquiry Commission that was to be chaired by Chief Justice Hamoodur Rahman in 1972, and attended its proceedings. He testified before the commission and described the hostile mood of the military leadership when they decided to postpone the assembly session and launch a military operation in the eastern province. Ahsan stated:

On arrival in Rawalpindi, I was alarmed to notice the high tide of militarism flowing turbulently.... There was open talk of a military solution according to plan. I was caught quite unaware in this atmosphere for I know of no military solution which could possibly solve whatever crisis was supposed to be impending in the minds of the authorities. It was evident from the statement that the decision to launch a military operation was taken without consulting the Governor of East Pakistan who was the only sane voice in the government.

The President presided over the meeting of the governors and martial law administrators attended as usual by the military and the civilian officers of the intelligence community. It is relevant to record that among the tribe of governors and MLAs, I was the only non-army governor and the only active naval officer in the midst of active service men. I was the only person, though a non-Bengali, who had to represent the sentiments of seventy million Bengalis to a Pakistani government. During the past 17 months, in meetings and conferences, my brief ran counter to the cut-and-dried solutions of Pakistan representatives and civil servants. The president invariably gave decisions which accommodated East Pakistan's viewpoint, at least partially. This made me unpopular with my colleagues who probably thought I was "difficult at best" and "sold" to the Bengalis at worst.

Post-retirement
Ahsan retired from the Navy in late 1971. He was appointed chairman of Port Qasim Authority in 1972 and later chairman of National Shipping Corporation from 1975 to 1976. After leaving the public service in 1976, he spent his remaining years in quietness and put himself out of public eye during his last years. During his last years, Admiral Ahsan learned French and played bridge.

Death and legacy
Ahsan died peacefully in 1989 in his Karachi villa and was given an honorary guard of honor by the Government of Pakistan and buried in military graveyard in Karachi per accordance to his will. His death was mourned by Prime Minister Benazir Bhutto, President Ghulam Ishaq, Chairman joint chiefs Admiral Iftikhar Ahmed Sirohey, and Chiefs of Staff of Army, Navy, and Air Force.

In 1990, the Pakistan Navy established a naval base in Balochistan and commissioned in 1991 as PNS Ahsan to honor his services.

The main channel of the Port Qasim bears his name, as it known as Ahsan Channel, which was inaugurated by Prime minister Benazir Bhutto who acknowledged Admiral Ahsan's as the founder of Port Qasim at a speech on the occasion of the opening of a new terminal at Port Qasim on 4 August 1989.

See also
 Hyderabad State
 Muhajirs

References

External links
 A leaf from history: Advice that went down the drain
 Navy website

|-

1920 births
1990 deaths
People from Hyderabad State
Osmania University alumni
Indian statisticians
Indian military personnel of World War II
Royal Indian Navy officers
Indian people of World War II
Pakistani people of Hyderabadi descent
Pakistani spies
Intelligence analysts
People of Inter-Services Intelligence
Pakistani diplomats
College of Naval Command and Staff alumni
Pakistan Navy admirals
Admirals of the Indo-Pakistani War of 1965
Chiefs of Naval Staff (Pakistan)
Finance Ministers of Pakistan
Commerce Ministers of Pakistan
Governors of East Pakistan
Translators to French
Urdu–English translators
Admirals of the Indo-Pakistani War of 1971
Pakistani conscientious objectors
People from Karachi
People from Islamabad
Recipients of the Sitara-e-Pakistan
Foreign recipients of the Legion of Merit
Pakistani naval attachés
Indian emigrants to Pakistan
Recipients of the Distinguished Service Cross (United Kingdom)
Indian recipients of the Distinguished Service Cross (United Kingdom)